PathMinder is file manager software, or DOS shell originally designed for use under DOS disk operating systems. Published by Westlake Data Corporation of Austin, Texas, and designed by Albert Nurick and Brittain Fraley, it was first released on 30 September 1984 and became fairly popular. Although the user interface was composed of text characters, it had many graphical elements, especially when PathMinder Plus was released in 1989, and the Reconfigurable User Interface was introduced. 

PathMinder won numerous computer industry awards and product comparisons, and was nominated for PC Magazine's Technical Excellence award.

PathMinder was the first DOS shell to incorporate an integrated text editor, the first to include an application manager, and the first to include activity logging.

The program filled a required niche in the market, as DOS shipped with no graphical file manager, until the generally unsuccessful DOS Shell that was provided with MS-DOS 4. 

PathMinder had several key features which contributed to its success, including a virtual loader that required only 4kb of RAM when other programs were running, an important feature when less than 640kb of RAM were available on systems of the day.

A version of PathMinder was independently developed in 1988 to run on the CP/M operating system.

PathMinder suffered a terminal decline after the widespread usage of Microsoft Windows.  Westlake Data released a version of PathMinder designed for the Windows 3.1 operating system called PathMinder Does Windows, but it met with little critical or commercial success.

See also
 Comparison of file managers

References

External links
 InfoWorld Review
 Dabbling with DOS Directories
 Pathminder+ Utilities Include Crosstalk, Editor
 Arthur-PC

DOS software
File managers